Égoïste is a men's perfume produced by French fashion house Chanel. It was created by perfumer Jacques Polge. The perfume was released in 1990. The word is French for "egoist", which means selfish or self-centered.

Commercials for the perfume have been directed by Jean-Paul Goude.

Product history
Based on Bois des Îles, Égoïste is the first male perfume with sandalwood oil as its main note. Another of its components is ambrette seed. The fragrance's name when it was introduced domestically in the 1980s was Bois Noir, French for "Black Wood", a name that was originally used in the working stage. Prior to its 1990 international launch, the product was rebranded because Chanel's marketing department did not like the Bois Noir name. The company had to purchase the rights to use the Égoïste name from photography magazine publisher Nicole Wisniak.

Advertising
The centerpiece of Chanel's advertising campaign to launch Égoïste first in Europe in April 1990 and in the United States one year later was a 30-second commercial, in French without subtitles, directed by Jean-Paul Goude and costing more than $1 million. It was filmed in a desert outside of Rio de Janeiro. A stucco facade inspired by that of the InterContinental Carlton Cannes Hotel was constructed by 300 workers in less than four weeks.

Its primary feature was 36 balconies situated four high and nine wide, each with shuttered doors. With "Dance of the Knights" from Sergei Prokofiev's ballet Romeo and Juliet as its background music, the film opens in black-and-white with a sequence of women dressed in ball gowns shouting lines adapted from Pierre Corneille's tragicomic play Le Cid:

The ad won a Gold Lion award at the International Advertising Festival held at Cannes. Égoïste's sales exceeded initial projections by 35 to 40 percent fifteen months after the international launch.

Notes

References

Perfumes
Chanel perfumes
History of cosmetics
Products introduced in 1990
20th-century perfumes